Irengia is a genus of parasitic flies in the family Tachinidae. There are at least two described species in Irengia.

Species
These two species belong to the genus Irengia:
 Irengia guianensis Townsend, 1935
 Irengia lativentris (Curran, 1934)

References

Further reading

 
 
 
 

Tachinidae
Articles created by Qbugbot